Petit-Mécatina is an unorganized territory in the Côte-Nord region of Quebec, Canada, part of Le Golfe-du-Saint-Laurent Regional County Municipality. It was formerly part of the Minganie Regional County Municipality, but transferred to the current MRC in July 2010.

It is named after the Petit Mécatina River that bisects the territory from north to south and empties in the Gulf of Saint Lawrence just west of Petit Mécatina Island. The  river forms east of Lake Aticonac just south of the boundary between the Atlantic and Saint Lawrence watersheds, that is also the disputed boundary between Quebec and Labrador. Mécatina comes from the Innu word makatinau and means "large mountain".

As part of the Labrador boundary dispute, the official borders of Petit-Mécatina as claimed by Quebec include part of the territory of Labrador.

Demographics
The region has been completely uninhabited since at least 1991.

Population

See also
 List of unorganized territories in Quebec

References

Unorganized territories in Côte-Nord